Deadpool is a 2016 American superhero film based on the Marvel Comics character of the same name, distributed by 20th Century Fox. It is the eighth installment of the X-Men film series. The film was directed by Tim Miller from a screenplay by Rhett Reese and Paul Wernick, and stars Ryan Reynolds in the title role alongside Morena Baccarin, Ed Skrein, T.J. Miller, Gina Carano, Leslie Uggams, Brianna Hildebrand, and Stefan Kapičić. In Deadpool, Wade Wilson hunts the man who gave him mutant abilities, but also a scarred physical appearance, as the wisecracking, fourth wall-breaking antihero Deadpool.

After spending ten years in "development hell", Deadpool received a green light from Fox with a much smaller budget than is usually given to a big superhero film, $58 million. This gave the production team—including Miller in his directorial debut— the freedom to create the film that they desired, after Reynolds' portrayal of the character in X-Men Origins: Wolverine was not well received. Focus was placed on reproducing the tone, humor, and violence of the comics. Deadpool premiered at the Grand Rex in Paris on February 8, 2016, and was released in the United States on February 12, 2016. The film became a financial and critical success, grossing over $783 million and receiving an 83% approval rating on Rotten Tomatoes.

The film has received numerous awards and nominations, recognizing the performance of the cast, particularly Reynolds as Deadpool; several technical areas, including the film's makeup, sound, and visual effects; and the film's extensive marketing campaign. Deadpool was nominated for two Golden Globe Awards, as well as four Critics' Choice Movie Awards (winning two), a Directors Guild of America Award, five Empire Awards, seven Golden Trailer Awards (winning two), two Grand Clio Key Art Awards for marketing (winning both), eight MTV Movie Awards (winning two), a Producers Guild of America Award, four People's Choice Awards (winning two), six Teen Choice Awards (winning two), a Writers Guild of America Award, and three Saturn Awards (winning one). The film also has a Hugo Award nomination, and appeared on several critics' top ten lists for 2016.

Accolades

References

External links
 

Deadpool
Deadpool (film series)
Deadpool accolades